Hong may refer to:

Places 
Høng, a town in Denmark
Hong Kong, a city and a special administrative region in China
Hong, Nigeria
Hong River in China and Vietnam
Lake Hong in China

Surnames 
Hong (Chinese name)
Hong (Korean name)

Organizations 
Hong (business), general term for a 19th–20th century trading company based in Hong Kong, Macau or Canton
Hongmen (洪門), a Chinese fraternal organization

Creatures 
Hamsa (bird), a mythical bird also known was hong
Hong (rainbow-dragon), a two-headed dragon in Chinese mythology
Hong (genus), a genus of ladybird